John Cassavetes began his career in film in 1953 and ended it in 1986, between which times he was involved in every aspect of the film, television, and stage arts, including acting, directing, scoring, shooting, editing, producing, and marketing.

As director

As actor

References

Further reading
Carney, Raymond Francis, Junior, “American Dreaming: The Films of John Cassavetes and the American Experience,” (Berkeley and Los Angeles, California and London: University of California Press, 1985).

John Cassavetes
Male actor filmographies
Director filmographies
American filmographies